Academy Abano Teolo is an Italian football club based the office in Abano Terme and operational headquarters in Teolo, Veneto. Since the season 2019–2020, deals only with the youth sector.

History

Thermal Abano and Teolo
The club was founded in 2005 as Thermal Abano in Abano Terme. In 2011 it was renamed Thermal Abano Teolo after the merger with C.S.R.Teolo.

Serie D
In the season 2012–13 the team was promoted for the first time, from Eccellenza Veneto/A to Serie D/D. At the end of the 2014–15 season in Serie D/D, they were relegated to Eccellenza.

Thermal Teolo and Academy Thermal Teolo

In 2015 it was renamed Thermal Teolo after the departure from the city of Abano Terme. At the end of the 2016–17 season in Eccellenza, they were relegated to Promozione.
In the 2017/18 season Thermal Teolo has participated in Promozione. Unfortunately it only achieved the last position, and was relegated to Prima Categoria.

Since the season 2019–2020, deals only with the youth sector.

Academy Abano Teolo
On 25 May 2020, the Academy Thermal Teolo and Abano Calcio join forces to create a new company, dedicated only to the youth sector.

In 2021, the team's San Giuseppe Abano and Polisportiva Bresseo Treponti, join the project.

References

External links
Official website

Football clubs in Italy
Football clubs in Veneto